Aeolothapsa malacella is a moth of the family Oecophoridae. It is found in Australia, more specifically Tasmania, New South Wales and Victoria. The average wingspan of the species is around 1cm.

The larvae feed on the dead leaves of Eucalyptus species.

References

Oecophorinae
Moths described in 1885